"No Leaf Clover" is the eighth song on the live album S&M by Metallica and the San Francisco Symphony. The song (along with "- Human") was one of two new pieces completed for the band's collaboration with the San Francisco Symphony in 1999. It begins with an intro section played by the orchestra, before entering into a clean guitar part by James Hetfield. The rest of the piece alternates between clean choruses and verses backed by heavily distorted guitars. Nowadays when the song is performed live, the orchestra backing track or footage of the S&M performance is used for the orchestra intro. 

It was the band's fourth No. 1 hit on the Billboard Hot Mainstream Rock Tracks chart. It stayed at No. 1 for seven consecutive weeks. It was also featured in the trailer created by the distributor A.D. Vision for their DVD releases of the TV series Farscape.

"No Leaf Clover" is featured as a playable track in the 2009 music game Guitar Hero: Metallica.

Single track listing

Australian version
 "No Leaf Clover" (Hetfield, Ulrich) – 5:43
 "One" (Hetfield, Ulrich) – 7:47
 "Enter Sandman" (Hammett, Hetfield, Ulrich) – 7:11
 "No Leaf Clover" (video) (Hetfield, Ulrich) – 5:46
 "S&M Documentary" (video) – 35:49

All tracks are from the album S&M.

UK version #1
 "No Leaf Clover" (Hetfield, Ulrich) – 5:43
"No Leaf Clover" ("Slice & Dice video") – 5:37
S&M Documentary Part 1 – 11:24

UK version #2
 "No Leaf Clover" (Hetfield, Ulrich) – 5:43
Photo gallery/album lyrics
S&M Documentary Part 2 – 17:13

UK version #3
 "No Leaf Clover" (Hetfield, Ulrich) – 5:43
Metallica screensaver
S&M Documentary Part 3 – 16:43

Chart positions

Release history

References

Metallica songs
1999 songs
2000 singles
Live singles
San Francisco Symphony
Songs written by James Hetfield
Songs written by Lars Ulrich
Song recordings produced by Bob Rock